Lake Mallos is a medium-sized lake in Finland. It is situated in the municipality of Kangasniemi in the Southern Savonia region in eastern Finland. The lake belongs to the Kymijoki main catchment area.

See also
List of lakes in Finland

References

Lakes of Kangasniemi